5β-Dihydroprogesterone (5β-DHP, pregnanedione, or 5β-pregnane-3,20-dione) is an endogenous neurosteroid and an intermediate in the biosynthesis of pregnanolone and epipregnanolone from progesterone. It is synthesized from progesterone by the enzyme 5β-reductase.

5β-DHP has been found to act as a positive allosteric modulator of the GABAA receptor (albeit with an affinity for this receptor regarded as relatively low in comparison to 3α-hydroxylated progesterone metabolites such as pregnanolone and allopregnanolone) and also as a negative allosteric modulator of the GABAA-rho receptor. In accordance with the former action, it has been found to possess anesthetic, anxiolytic, and antinociceptive effects. 5β-DHP has been found to act as an agonist of the pregnane X receptor (PXR) as well (albeit weakly (EC50 >10,000 μM)), and has been found to regulate uterine contractility through activation of this receptor. Unlike 5α-dihydroprogesterone, 5β-DHP possesses only very weak affinity for the progesterone receptor (1.2% of that of progesterone in rhesus monkey uterus), and in relation to this, is not a notable progestogen.

A study found that 5β-DHP, but not progesterone, directly bound to and antagonized the oxytocin receptor at nanomolar concentrations, and it was suggested that this may be one of the mechanisms by which progesterone maintains pregnancy. However, a subsequent study was unable to replicate this finding, and there has been no further investigation since. In any case, 5β-DHP has nonetheless been shown to possess tocolytic effects in animals, and this may alternatively be mediated by activation of the PXR.

See also
 5α-Dihydroprogesterone
 3α-Dihydroprogesterone
 Isopregnanolone
 3β-Dihydroprogesterone

References

5β-Pregnanes
Diketones
GABAA receptor positive allosteric modulators
GABAA-rho receptor negative allosteric modulators
Neurosteroids
Pregnane X receptor agonists